

The Mil Mi-58 was a projected twin-turbine passenger helicopter based on the Mil Mi-28 first announced at the 1995 Paris Air Show. It was planned to have two 2,088 kW Klimov TV3-117VMA-SB3 turboshaft engines, Mi-28's main rotor and Delta H tail rotor, and fixed tricycle-type landing gear with one nosewheel and two rear wheels on long sponsons. It was said to accommodate 20 passengers with various seating configurations.

References

Proposed aircraft of Russia
Mil aircraft
Soviet and Russian helicopters